There are 21 routes assigned to the "G" zone of the California Route Marker Program, which designates county routes in California. The "G" zone includes county highways in Monterey, San Benito, San Luis Obispo, Santa Clara, and Santa Cruz counties.

G1

County Route G1 (CR G1) is a road in San Benito County, California, United States, providing access to Fremont Peak State Park from State Route 156 in San Juan Bautista. It is signed as San Juan Canyon Road for almost the entire length except for a small portion of The Alameda.

Route description
From the southern end of G1 on Fremont Peak as San Juan Canyon Road, G1 begins a steep, sharp-curved winding descent from around 3,000 feet for the first 2 miles, north to northeast. G1 then curves to the west for about 2 miles before turning north. At the intersection of Mission Vineyard Road, G1 becomes The Alameda, which then heads north for approximately 1/4 mile before reaching the northern terminus at State Route 156. Beyond the northern terminus, The Alameda continues into downtown San Juan Bautista for 0.2 miles until the intersection of First Street.

Major intersections

G2

The majority of G2 is part of the Santa Clara County expressway system.

Route description 

G2 runs from the Quito Road overcrossing of SR 85 in Saratoga, north along Quito Road. G2 is not signed along this section and is not commonly recognized as existing along this 2 lane road by either locals or mapmakers. The Quito Road portion is also maintained by the City of Saratoga rather than Santa Clara County.

As the road leaves Saratoga and enters San Jose, it widens to a 6 lane county-maintained expressway with a concrete island divider; at this point it becomes Lawrence Expressway. The Lawrence Expressway section from just south of Saratoga Avenue is more readily recognized as G2. Local residents almost exclusively refer to G2 as Lawrence Expressway. The road continues north, with access usually restricted to major intersections which are controlled via traffic lights.

Lawrence Expressway continues northeasterly and junctions with I-280 and Stevens Creek Boulevard over a complex shared separated grade crossing. Lawrence Expressway proceeds under I-280 before immediately rising over Stevens Creek Boulevard. San Tomas Expressway and Campbell Avenue also share ramps for access to I-280 with the exception of the onramp to Southbound I-280 which is accessed directly from Lawrence Expressway, a frequent cause of confusion for drivers on Stevens Creek Boulevard wishing to access I-280 due to unclear signage. Lawrence Expressway continues north into Santa Clara and widens to 8 lanes with an HOV lane occupying the far right lane.

Lawrence Expressway also has another separated grade interchange with El Camino Real (SR 82). Lawrence Expressway then enters Sunnyvale. At this point the expressway passes over Caltrain's Lawrence Station. Lawrence Expressway also passes under Central Expressway (G6) on a separated grade interchange and over US 101 on a separated grade interchange. The US 101 interchange was upgraded in the early 2000s to include traffic light control on G2.

G2 reaches its northern terminus at the end of Lawrence Expressway at the SR 237 Freeway. The physical road continues north as Caribbean Drive.

History

The designation G2 existed to the 1950s.  The route replaced what was originally called Lawrence Station Road (after the Southern Pacific Lawrence station), from Mountain View–Alviso Road in the north to Stevens Creek Blvd. on the south, roughly paralleling Saratoga Creek. Lawrence Station was itself named for Alfred Chester Lawrence.  Crossing Stevens Creek, the route was originally called Doyle Road, a small two lane road up to the point the current Doyle Road exits to the east.  The section between Doyle and Saratoga Avenue at Quito Road was originally orchards.

G2 was first signed as a Santa Clara County Route in 1962 as construction was completing on sections of the upgrade to an expressway. County Route G2 was originally planned to link up with SR 85 when it was built. At the time of G2's inception SR 85 was in the early planning stages and an interchange had been envisioned at Quito Road. However opposition to the freeway was intense in Saratoga and the planned interchange between SR 85 and G2 along with an interchange further north at Prospect Road were abandoned in favor of the existing Saratoga Avenue interchange. G2 is unsigned from SR 85 to Saratoga Avenue along Quito Road. North of Saratoga Avenue, Lawrence Expressway is currently signed as G2.

In the 1990s Lawrence Expressway was widened north of I-280 to 8 lanes to accommodate an HOV carpool lane.

As of 2019, Santa Clara County is planning a major grade separation project at Homestead Road. This will be one of the largest expressway improvement projects in many years.

Major intersections

G3

G3 runs through Palo Alto and unincorporated Stanford University lands. It is part of the Santa Clara County expressway system.

Route description

G3 begins in the west at its interchange with I-280, at the Los Altos Hills–Stanford border. It proceeds northeast as a four lane expressway over the rolling hills of Stanford University until it reaches Foothill Expressway (G5), at which it has an at-grade intersection. East of Foothill Expressway, G3 descends down into the more urban areas of the lower peninsula, going through the industrialized area of the Stanford Research Park located in Palo Alto. The road along this section has a reduced speed limit and several turnoffs along its length until it reaches El Camino Real (SR 82).

After SR 82, Oregon Expressway branches from Page Mill Road, which becomes a short two-lane street, and G3 follows Oregon Expressway under the Caltrain tracks and onward for the remainder of its northeastward journey. Oregon Expressway resumes expressway status with limited access confined mainly to large intersections. G3 reaches its eastern terminus at its junction with US 101.

It passes the entrance to Palo Alto's Foothills Park, and the Monte Bello and Los Trancos Open Space Preserves. Under the name West Alpine Road, the road descends west of Skyline Boulevard to a turn-off that leads to Portola Redwoods State Park, where the original Page sawmill was located. Other than a commemorative sign, no artifacts remain at the mill site, which is accessible only by Slate Creek Trail from either Portola Redwoods state park or from Skyline Boulevard (SR 35).

History

This route was designated in 1962. G3 is currently signed its entire length. Page Mill Road was originally known as Mayfield–Pescadero Road, but only a small portion of Page Mill Road is part of G3.

The widening of Oregon Avenue from a congested narrow residential street to a median-divided 4-lane Oregon Expressway was narrowly approved by Palo Alto voters in a June 5, 1962, election; about 90 homes on the south side of Oregon Avenue were moved or destroyed to make room for it.

Major intersections

G4

G4 is part of the Santa Clara County expressway system.

Route description

G4 begins in the south at its interchange with SR 17 and Camden Avenue as San Tomas Expressway in the city of Campbell. The road is three lanes wide in each direction, with an HOV carpool lane occupying the right lane, from SR 17 north to Homestead Road, where it expands to four lanes in each direction with an HOV lane until San Tomas "ends" at US 101. The majority of intersections along San Tomas are at grade, controlled by traffic lights. The only grade-separated intersections along San Tomas are at SR 17, US 101, Winchester (necessary due to a Union Pacific branchline), and the junction with Central Expressway (G6). G4 intersects at grade with El Camino Real in Santa Clara. Further north in Santa Clara, G4 crosses US 101 and becomes Montague Expressway.

Montague Expressway is signed as an east–west route, however it is not signed as G4 along its entire length. Montague continues east as an 8 lane road until it crosses Interstate 880 on the San Jose/Milpitas city line, where it loses a lane to become a 6 lane road. G4 reaches its eastern terminus at Interstate 680 but the physical road continues as Landess Ave further east until it ends at its intersection with Piedmont Road.

History
G4 was designated and signed in 1962 along the San Tomas portions. Montague was designated later around 1978. Whether this has anything to do with Montague and not being physically signed as G4 is uncertain. Emergency Call boxes along Montague however are labeled as being on G4 leaving no doubt that Montague is part of G4.

Original plans called for G4 to include Hillsdale Avenue and Camden Avenue, between its present-day southern terminus and the southern terminus of Capitol Expressway (G21). These plans were never brought to fruition.

Major intersections

G5

G5 connects Palo Alto, California to the Silicon Valley proper closely paralleling I-280 through the lower Santa Cruz Mountains foothills. This route is part of the Santa Clara County expressway system. The speed limit for much of Foothill Expressway is 45 mph.

Route description

G5 begins at its southeastern end at I-280 in Cupertino, California. It proceeds northwest directly east of I-280 making it a viable alternative route for short trips between Cupertino and Palo Alto. The road is a four-lane expressway along its entire route. Access is generally limited to major intersections that are governed by traffic lights except for an interchange at Fremont Avenue, which the interchange also provides access to Miramonte Avenue and Loyola Drive. G5 travels through several affluent neighborhoods in Los Altos before reaching its northern terminus at the intersection with Page Mill Road (G3). The physical road continues north as Junipero Serra Boulevard and passes the back entrances to Stanford University.

History
G5 was designated in 1962 and is currently signed its entire length. The route was built upon the right-of-way for the Los Altos branch of the Peninsular Railway. The buildings along the route at Loyola Corners in Los Altos are historical railroad station buildings.

In 1970 one of the first scientifically designed noise barriers in the nation was conceived for Foothill Expressway in a study overseen by the Santa Clara County Public Works Department using Sunnyvale consultant ESL Inc.

Major intersections

G6

While paralleling US 101, El Camino Real (SR 82) and I-280, all of which are signed north–south, Central Expressway is signed east–west. This is due to the fact that all of these routes move in an east–west direction in this area, but these other routes continue longer than Central Expressway and are mostly north–south overall. This route is part of the Santa Clara County expressway system.

Route description

Route G6 actually begins in the west at Oregon Expressway as Alma Street in Palo Alto.  In Palo Alto, G6 remains a major surface street with four lanes of traffic and a center turning lane to service the many driveways and turnoffs available.  At the Palo Alto – Mountain View border at San Antonio Road, G6's character changes, removing the driveways and frequent intersections and adding a center divider, and is renamed Central Expressway. Central continues east as a 4 lane road through the city of Mountain View. Through this section Central Expressway has more at-grade intersections than is typical for a designated expressway.  This section's intersections are primarily at-grade with cross streets controlled by traffic lights, although there are some overpasses, such as for San Antonio Road, Shoreline Blvd., Whisman Ave, SR 237 and SR 85.

Up to this point, the road parallels the Caltrain rail line, which limits the intersections and driveways on the south side of the road.

After crossing under SR 85, Central Expressway takes on a very freeway-like appearance (which is not typical for most county roads) for several miles through Sunnyvale. Through this section Central Expressway has a wide center divider and a sequence of several separated grade interchanges with main cross streets and no turnoffs or driveways. The final in this sequence is at Lawrence Expressway. East of Lawrence Expressway, Central Expressway resumes at grade intersections along with sporadic HOV lanes at the approaches to intersections. Central has one final separated grade interchange with San Tomas Expressway. Route G6 makes a turn onto De La Cruz for a few hundred feet until it reaches its terminus at US 101, just outside the north end of San Jose International Airport.

History
Central Expressway was first designated in 1962. Central Expressway was a vital route through the western Silicon Valley in the days before US 101 had been widened  and I-280 had been built as an alternate route. Central Expressway still acts as an alternate route to US 101 through the west valley, however usage has declined as both freeways are now much larger and more direct routes. Construction was completed in 2007 near the eastern terminus widening Central Expressway to accommodate an HOV lane and a reconfiguration of the intersection with Lafayette Street.

Central Expressway is currently signed as G6 sporadically along its entire length.

In 1982, the prohibition against bicyclists using Central Expressway's shoulders was lifted. All pedestrian prohibitions were repealed by 2003.

Major intersections

G7

County Route G7 (CR G7) is a road in Santa Clara County, California, United States, southeast of Gilroy.  The road is known as Bloomfield Avenue for its entire length, which runs from State Route 25 near US 101 to State Route 152.

The route serves as a bypass for travelers who are traveling from westbound State Route 152 to southbound U.S. Route 101. County Route G7 bypasses the State Route 152 at U.S. Route 101 interchange, where State Route 152 is signed as 10th Street. This bypass avoids considerable amounts of traffic congestion that is the result of large retail shopping centers on both sides of 10th Street.

County Route G7 also serves Frazier Lake Airpark via Frazer Lake Road, as well as the Christopher Ranch garlic facility.

Major intersections

G8

County Route G8 is an important north–south arterial road from the south valley area of Santa Clara County, California, USA to near Downtown San Jose. G8 is also part of the Santa Clara County expressway system.

Route description
G8 begins in the south at its junction with State Route 152 in Gilroy. It proceeds north along Watsonville Road as a two-lane country road until it reaches the intersection of Watsonville Rd and Uvas Road. G8 turns left and proceeds north along Uvas Road which is a winding two-lane mountain road that passes by Uvas, Chesbro and Calero reservoirs and their surrounding parks. In Calero Reservoir County Park, Uvas Road is renamed McKean Road and proceeds into the Almaden Valley area of San Jose. At the north end of McKean Rd, G8 turns briefly right on Harry Road for a short distance and then left on to the south end of Almaden Expressway.

As Almaden Expressway, G8 begins as a 2-lane undivided road for 1/2 mile before expanding to 4-lane divided expressway approaching the intersection of Almaden Road. Almaden Expressway eventually expands to a 6-8 lane expressway with the majority of access limited to major intersections controlled by traffic signals. The major exception to this is near Highway 85 and Blossom Hill Road (G10) where there are several major shopping centers.

G8 intersects G10 at Blossom Hill Rd and SR 85 a quarter mile north. This interchange is one of the busiest in Silicon Valley due to several shopping centers and a Costco warehouse store all sharing driveways with this interchange. G8 continues north resuming its expressway design. G8 shares a separated grade interchange with the terminus of Capitol Expressway Auto Mall and again with Murillo Avenue and Tully Road and Curtner Avenue. Other intersections along this part of the route are at grade. Almaden Expressway crosses State Route 87 with which it shares a northbound only interchange.

G8 continues past the north end of Almaden Expressway on to Almaden Road as a 4-lane city street. At the intersection Almaden Road and Alma Avenue, G8 turns east along Alma Ave and proceeds for about a quarter mile to its eastern terminus at First Street (former SR 82).

History
G8 was originally designated in 1962 along Almaden Expressway which had begun construction in 1959. Almaden Expressway was not completed to its southern terminus until 1984. Before that time the section between McKean Rd and the southern end of the expressway (which was further north at the time) took a zig zag path from McKean Rd to Harry Rd to Almaden Road (S) to Barnes Lane, to the then southern end of Almaden Expressway.

G8 is signed sporadically along its entire length.

Major intersections

G9

County Route G9 (CR G9) is a road in Santa Clara County, California, United States.  The route runs along Leavesley Road from State Route 152's northern interchange with US 101 in Gilroy and then curves southward onto Ferguson Road. The route's eastern terminus is at SR 152 (Pacheco Pass Highway) east of Gilroy.

County Route G9 serves shoppers traveling to the Gilroy Premium Outlets, which features more than 145 stores and is the largest collection of outlet stores in Northern California.

County Route G9 serves several agricultural facilities along its route. It also serves travelers as a bypass around the city of Gilroy, who wish to avoid the congestion at 10th Street and U.S. Route 101.

Major intersections

G10

County Route G10 (CR G10), known as Los Gatos-Saratoga Road, Los Gatos Boulevard, and more commonly known along the majority of its route as Blossom Hill Road for the majority of its length, is an important east–west arterial roadway through the Almaden Valley area of Santa Clara County, California, United States in the Silicon Valley.

Route description
County Route G10 begins at its western end at the junction of SR 17 and Los Gatos-Saratoga Road (formerly Saratoga Avenue) in Los Gatos. It travels east on Los Gatos-Saratoga Road to the end of that road then turns northeast along Los Gatos Boulevard. Along this stretch, CR G10 is a narrow road that proceeds over Blossom Hill, the hill that the road takes its name from. At the base of Blossom Hill, CR G10 enters San Jose and the Almaden Valley neighborhood.

CR G10 proceeds as a busy 4-6 lane artery through this area, intersecting Almaden Expressway and further east, through the Blossom Valley neighborhood of San Jose, to SR 85.  Prior to the completion of the segments of SR 85 between 1991 and 1994, which CR G10 roughly parallels, Blossom Hill Road was the major accessway to this area of San Jose from the west.

CR G10 reaches its eastern terminus at former prior-to-2013 SR 82, a few hundred feet (~100 meters) shy of US 101.  Blossom Hill Road continues to US 101 and then over the freeway becoming Silver Creek Valley Road, before continuing as Nieman Boulevard and terminating at the junction with Capitol Expressway.

History
G10 was designated in 1964 as a county road. As of 2005, however, the road is no longer maintained by the county and is city street along its entire length. G10 is also only sporadically signed along its route and has been largely abandoned by the county after the completion of SR 85.

Major intersections

G11

County Route G11 (CR G11) is a county road in unincorporated Monterey County, California, United States. The route runs from Porter Drive (County Route G12) in Pajaro along San Juan Road through the Pajaro Valley and terminates at US 101 south of Aromas.

Route description
County Route G11 begins as San Juan Road at the intersection of Porter Drive (County Route G12) in Pajaro. It leaves Pajaro and continues east for a 3/4 mile before gradually turning southeast towards Aromas. The road enters a brief, but steep hill for a 3/4 mile with a passing lane, then returns as a two-lane road turning south and then southeast. Nearing the eastern terminus at US 101, CR G11 curves to the east and then sharply turns southeast. CR G11 crosses into San Benito County approximately one hundred feet (60 meters) before reaching its terminus at US 101.

It provides an alternative route from Gilroy and Hollister towards Santa Cruz, bypassing the twistier, hillier routes 152 and 129, which, like Highway 17, can be daunting to novice drivers.

Major intersections

G12

County Route G12 is a road in Santa Cruz and Monterey Counties. This portion arrives at Elkhorn Road, where G12 turns northward for  before joining Salinas Road first to enter Pajaro, where the route becomes Porter Road, and then crosses into Santa Cruz County to enter Watsonville, where the route joins Main Street and terminates at State Route 129.

G13

County Route G13 is a county road in Monterey and San Benito Counties.  The route runs almost  between King City in Monterey County and Route 25 in San Benito County.

G13 begins in King City at the interchange with U.S. Route 101 in King City as a city street. It turns east through downtown King City for one mile before turning northwest on First Street, which then becomes Lyons Street and turning northeast to become Bitterwater Road, passing Mesa Del Rey Airport and leaving the city limits. G13 then enters a hilly area before crossing into San Benito County for an additional six miles and terminating at the junction of State Route 25 at Bitterwater.

G14

Route description
G14 begins at the intersection of US 101 and State Route 46 in Paso Robles. It then heads west for less than one mile (~1.5 km) before leaving the city limits as Nacimiento Lake Drive and turning mainly northwest for 15 miles. G14 then crosses the Nacimiento Dam for 1/4 mile before reaching a steep hill with a brief winding curve. G14 then turns west onto Interlake Road while Nacimiento Lake Drive continues as G19. As Interlake Road, G14 heads west with a brief curve to the north for a few miles and passing Lake San Antonio before turning mainly northwest and eventually north towards the town of Lockwood. Just a few hundred feet (~100 meters) south of Lockwood, G14 reaches the intersection of the western terminus of G18 and heads west along Jolon Road. As G14 reaches the small town of Jolon, a side road provides an entrance to Fort Hunter Liggett military facility while G14 curves to the north. G14 continues north through the southern end of the Santa Lucia range for several miles to reach the southern Salinas Valley. G14 terminates at US 101 west of King City.

County Route G14 is a California State Scenic Highway.

G15

Monterey County Route G15 is a road running almost  along the eastern edge of the Salinas Valley.  The road parallels US 101 (and therefore El Camino Real) between King City and Soledad, with 101 to the west of the Salinas River and G15 to the east and following the western foot of the Gabilan Range.

The route begins at US 101 southeast of King City and follows First Street through the city, where it intersects County Route G13 and exits the city as Metz Road.  G15 follows this road  northwestward, bypassing Greenfield for the unincorporated community of Metz and terminating at State Route 146 near Soledad.

G16

Monterey County Route G16 runs  between the Santa Lucia Range and the Sierra de Salinas in Monterey County, California.  The route, beginning from California State Route 1 follows Carmel Valley Road along the Carmel River into the Carmel Valley and southeastward into the community of the same name, near which the road intersects with Monterey County Route G20.  After  the route turns eastward onto Arroyo Seco Road near Millers Ranch. At the junction with G17, G16 joins Elm Avenue and enters the Salinas Valley, later passing through Greenfield, crossing the Salinas River, and terminating at Monterey County Route G15 near the valley's eastern edge.

G17

County Route G17 was constructed in 1955, and is part of the De Anza National Historic trail. It extends from Reservation Road to Elm Avenue.

Route description
G17 begins as a three-way intersection with G16 near Millers Ranch as Arroyo Seco Road. It then briefly heads northeast before turning north for several miles closely paralleling the eastern end of the Arroyo Seco until at the intersection at Fort Romie Road south of Fort Romie. G17 then proceeds northwest on Fort Romie Road as Arroyo Seco Road continues east to its terminus at US 101. Just after passing the Mission Soledad historic site, G17 turns southwest for 1000 feet before reverting northwest. G17 continues for another 2 miles until the intersection with Foothill Road, becoming River Road. As River Road, G17 continues northwest for several more miles along the Salinas River until the intersection with Gonzales River Road near Gonzales, which G17 turns southwest for 1/4 mile before reverting northwest. As the road nears Chualar, G17 has another intersection with Chualar River Road and heads northwest, closely following the Salinas River. Shortly before the interchange with State Route 68, G17 becomes a 4-lane undivided road for about 1/2 mile before reverting to a 2-lane road and becoming Reservation Road.

As Reservation Road, G17 continues northwest along the Salinas River with occasional sharp curves until reaching a brief steep hill south of Marina and becoming a 4-lane divided road. G17 remains a 4-lane divided road for most of the length through Marina except between Del Monte Blvd and Beach Road. At Del Monte Blvd, G17 truncates back to a 2-lane city street, progressively turning north, with traffic circles until the intersection of Beach Road. G17 which then turns northwest for 600 feet, resuming a 4-lane road until the northern terminus at State Route 1.

G18

This route is signed as Jolon Road and runs between U.S. Route 101 on both ends. Although Jolon Road runs on both ends of 101, the western terminus of G18 is near Lockwood with the intersection of G14 and runs for approximately 16.4 miles.

G18 begins at the intersection of G14 (Interlake Road) and proceeds east for several miles as a continuation of Jolon Road. There is a junction with G19 (Nacimiento Lake Road) just a few hundred feet shy of its eastern terminus with highway 101.

G19

G19 runs from G18 (Jolon Rd) to G14 (Interlake Rd), and is signed as Nacimiento Lake Road for the whole route. G19's southern terminus is at Interlake Road, which is a continuation of G14 portion of Nacimento Lake Road. G19 heads northeast for approximately 1.25 miles until the intersection with Vista Road. Vista Road provides access to Lake San Antonio, while G19 continues east, progressively turning north and crossing the San Antonio River before a sharp curve to the east. G19 then follows northeast along the San Antonio River for approximately one mile (1.6 km) before continuing north to the end at G18, a few hundred feet from U.S. Route 101 near Bradley.

G20

County Route G20, also known as Laureles Grade, is a steep, winding road running  to connect Carmel Valley's G16 with State Route 68 halfway between Monterey and Salinas. It is on the California Scenic Highway System.

G21

Capitol Expressway is part of the Santa Clara County expressway system.

Route description
G21/Capitol Expressway begins at an interchange with State Route 87, as a continuation of Capitol Expressway Auto Mall. It continues east and northeast to a junction with Highway 101 and then north into East San Jose. In East San Jose, Capitol Expressway turns west to intersect with I-680 and officially ends at Jackson Avenue, changing its name to East San Antonio Street.

Where Capitol Expressway turns west toward I-680 in Alum Rock, Capitol Avenue continues north, ending in Milpitas at an intersection with Montague Expressway.

History
Capitol Expressway was designated in 1978 from Almaden Expressway to US 101, including what is now Capitol Expressway Auto Mall. Construction on the eastern portion from US 101 to I-680 was not completed until 1997.

In the late 1990s the portion of the expressway from Almaden Expressway to SR 87 was transferred from Santa Clara County to the city of San Jose. San Jose then converted it into an auto row and renamed it Capitol Expressway Auto Mall.

Capitol Expressway is signed as G21 along its length.

See also

References

G*